Mack at It Again is a 1914 short comedy film starring Mabel Normand and Mack Sennett.  Mack Sennett also directed the film.  The picture was produced by Sennett's Keystone Film Company and distributed by Mutual Film.

External links
 
Madcap Mabel: Mabel Normand Website
Looking-for-Mabel
Mabel Normand Home Page

Silent American comedy films
American silent short films
1914 films
1914 comedy films
Keystone Studios films
1914 short films
American black-and-white films
American comedy short films
1910s English-language films
Films directed by Mack Sennett
1910s American films